Duffel is a railway station in the town of Duffel, Antwerp, Belgium. The station opened on 16 June 1836 on the Lines 25 and 27. The train services are operated by National Railway Company of Belgium (NMBS).

Train services
The station is served by the following services:

Brussels RER services (S1) Antwerp - Mechelen - Brussels - Waterloo - Nivelles (weekdays)
Brussels RER services (S1) Antwerp - Mechelen - Brussels (weekends)

References

External links
 Duffel railway station at Belgian Railways website

Railway stations in Belgium
Railway stations in Antwerp Province
Duffel
Railway stations in Belgium opened in 1836